Lot's wife is a biblical figure who turned into a pillar of salt.

Lot's wife may also refer to:

Geography
 Lot's Wife (crag), a volcanic, deserted island located in the Philippine Sea
 Baltimore Beacon,  known as "Lot's Wife", a stone beacon at the entrance to the harbour at Baltimore, County Cork, Ireland
 Lot's Wife, a rock off the north coast of Gough Island, in the South Atlantic
 "Lot's Wife" pillar, Mount Sodom, Israel
 Lot's Wife and Lot, rock formations in Saint Helena, in the South Atlantic
 Lot's Wife, nickname of Long Ya Men, a craggy granite outcrop in Keppel Harbour, Singapore, destroyed in 1848
 Lot's Wife, a chalk pillar once part of The Needles formation off the Isle of Wight, UK, until its collapse in 1764
 Lot's Wife sea-stack, Marsden, Tyne and Wear, UK

Sculptures
 Lot's Wife, an 1878 sculpture by Hamo Thornycroft
 Lot's Wife, a 1958 sculpture by Moshe Ziffer

Literature and media
 Lot's Wife (student newspaper) of Monash University's Clayton campus in Melbourne, Australia
 "Lot's Wife", short story by Joseph Heller in Catch as Catch Can

Movies
 Lot's Wife, a 2008 short film by Harjant Gill

Music
 "Lot's Wife", a reggae song by Prince Alla